The Gan-speaking Chinese or Jiangxi people or Jiangyou people or Kiang-Si people (old romanized spelling) are a subgroup of Han Chinese people. The origin of Gan-speaking people in China are from Jiangxi province in China. Gan-speaking populations are also found in Fujian, southern Anhui and Hubei provinces, and linguistic enclaves are found on Shaanxi, Sichuan, Zhejiang, Hunan, Hainan, Guangdong, Fujian and non-Gan speaking southern and western Jiangxi.

History

The historic homeland of Gan speakers, Jiangxi, was outside the sphere of influence of early Chinese civilization during the Shang dynasty (16th to 11th centuries). Information about this era is scarce, but it is likely that peoples collectively known as the Yue inhabited the region.

The unification of China by the Qin dynasty saw the incorporation of Jiangxi into the Qin empire. The First Emperor of Qin established seven counties in Jiangxi, all of them administered from the commandery seat of Jiujiang, located north of the Yangzi in modern Anhui. All of the commandery seats were located along the Gan River system. Military settlements were known to have existed at least two of the counties. The Qin colonisation formed the earliest settlement structure in Jiangxi and which for the most part, has survived to the present day.

During the early Ming dynasty, there was a forced massive population transfer of Gan speakers living in Jiangxi to depopulated northern and eastern parts of both Hunan and Hubei provinces. This large-skill resettlement caused the formation of the New Xiang dialect in Hunan. Gan speakers were again forcefully resettled into parts of Hunan and Hubei due to war caused depopulation during the early period of the Qing dynasty known as "江西填湖广" in Chinese.

Culture

Language
Jiangxi is the main area of concentration of the Gan varieties of Chinese, spoken over most of the northern two-thirds of the province. Examples include the Nanchang dialect, Yichun dialect and Ji'an dialect. The southern one-third of the province speaks Hakka. There are also Mandarin, Huizhou, and Wu dialects spoken along the northern border.

Cuisine
Although little known outside of the province, Jiangxi cuisine or Gan cuisine is rich and distinctive in its own style. Jiangxi flavors are some of the strongest in China, with heavy use of chile peppers and especially pickled and fermented products.

Others
Jingdezhen is widely regarded as the producer of the best porcelain in China.

Jiangxi also was a historical center of Chan Buddhism.

Ganju, or Jiangxi opera, is the type of Chinese opera performed in Jiangxi.

Areas of significant population
Gan-speaking people are found primarily in Jiangxi, Fujian, Anhui, Hunan, and Hubei provinces.

Enclaves within Shaanxi
Jiangxi Gan-speaking enclaves are found in villages scattered across Shangnan, Danfeng, Shanyang, Zhashui, Zhen'an, Hanbin, and Shiquan counties in Shaanxi province. The Mandarin-speaking population of Shaanxi refers to the Gan language as spoken in Shaanxi as Manzihua, or 'Barbarian speech'.

Enclaves in Hubei
There are roughly 5.3 million Gan Chinese Speakers living in Hubei, mostly concentrated in its eastern region.

Enclaves within Guangdong
There are about 20,000 Gan speakers living in Guangdong province, primarily in Nanxiong county and other districts. Hakka-speaking locals refer to the Gan language spoken in Northeastern Guangdong as Jiangxihua.

Enclaves within Sichuan
Jiangxi people are also found in Daqiao district in Huidong county in Sichuan province.

Enclaves within Fujian
There are 270,000 Gan speakers mainly living in North-western Fujian.

Enclaves within Guizhou
Qiandongnan Miao and Dong Autonomous Prefecture also has a Gan-speaking minority.

Enclaves within Hainan
In Danzhou, Changjiang, and Sanya, some villages speak a "Hakka-Gan dialect".

Enclaves within Taiwan
According to the Presbyterian Church in Taiwan, the number of Jiangxi people living in Taiwan is 124,670. Thus the number of Gan speakers is around 100 to 200 thousand.

Notable Gan speaker descendants
Ouyang Xiu, Jinshi scholar
Yuan Longping (Chinese: 袁隆平; born September 7, 1930) is a Chinese agronomist and educator, known for developing the first hybrid rice varieties.
Xie Jin, Chief Grand Secretary of the Ming Empire. 
Liu Shaoqi, Chairman of the People's Republic of China
Ang Lee, Taiwanese movie director
Ouyang Nana, Taiwanese actress

References

Subgroups of the Han Chinese
People from Jiangxi
Gan Chinese